Tylozygus is a genus of leafhoppers in the family Cicadellidae. There are about six described species in Tylozygus.

Species
These six species belong to the genus Tylozygus:
 Tylozygus bifidus (Say, 1830) c g b
 Tylozygus carabela (Metcalf & Bruner, 1936) c g
 Tylozygus descrepantius Nielson & Godoy, 1995 c g
 Tylozygus fasciatus (Walker, F., 1851) c
 Tylozygus geometricus (Signoret, 1854) c g b
 Tylozygus infulatus Nielson & Godoy, 1995 c g
Data sources: i = ITIS, c = Catalogue of Life, g = GBIF, b = Bugguide.net

References

Further reading

External links

 

Cicadellidae genera
Cicadellini